Andrew MacRae (born August 24, 1990) is a Canadian professional soccer player who plays as a goalkeeper.

Playing career

Ottawa Fury
After spending several months training with the club in 2015, MacRae signed his first professional contract with North American Soccer League side Ottawa Fury on February 2, 2016. In two seasons with Ottawa he failed to make an appearance and left the club at the end of 2017.

Larne
In spring 2018, MacRae joined Northern Irish Championship side Larne as a mid-season signing and made his debut on April 7, 2018 against PSNI. He made a further three appearances for Larne that season, starting in the club's final games of the season in late April, and conceded three goals in four league appearances overall.

FC Tulsa
On January 31, 2019 MacRae signed with USL Championship side Tulsa Roughnecks. On March 23, 2019 he made his professional debut as a substitute against the Tacoma Defiance.

References

External links
 

1990 births
Living people
Association football goalkeepers
Canadian soccer players
Soccer people from Nova Scotia
People from Kings County, Nova Scotia
Canadian expatriate soccer players
Expatriate association footballers in Northern Ireland
Canadian expatriate sportspeople in Northern Ireland
Expatriate soccer players in the United States
Canadian expatriate sportspeople in the United States
Acadia Axemen players
Ottawa Fury FC players
Larne F.C. players
FC Tulsa players
Première ligue de soccer du Québec players
North American Soccer League players
USL Championship players
NIFL Championship players